St. Francis Xavier Cathedral is the cathedral church of the Roman Catholic Diocese of Alexandria, located in Alexandria, Louisiana.

The cathedral and related buildings was added to the National Register of Historic Places on 29 March 1984 as St. Francis Xavier Cathedral Complex. The complex includes the cathedral building, St. Francis Academy (erected in 1897), and the rectory (erected in 1896 and renovated in 1930).

History
The old parish church of Saint Francis was constructed in 1817. It was the only building in Alexandria spared during the American Civil War. As the Union army pulled out of the town during the disastrous Red River Campaign, Father J. P. Bellier disguised his voice to impersonate that of General Nathaniel Banks, the Union commanding officer, and ordered the troops to spare the church. His plan succeeded and the building was saved.

The old building burned down in 1895. Efforts to rebuild a church started immediately. The foundation stone was laid down on 3 December 1895. Designed in Gothic revival style by Nicholas J. Clayton, the new church was dedicated on 30 November 1899, the first brick church in the city. In 1907, a belfry was added, and the clock was installed in 1908.

Because of the newly constructed church and Alexandria's central location, Bishop Cornelius Van de Ven petitioned the Roman Curia to transfer the seat of the diocese from Natchitoches to Alexandria. Pope Pius X granted this wish, changing the title to Diocese of Alexandria on 6 August 1910 and designating St. Francis Xavier Church as the cathedral of the newly created diocese.

The current bishop of Alexandria is the Most Reverend Robert W. Marshall, Jr., and the rector of the cathedral is Father James A. Ferguson.

Interior
The cathedral's rose windows are the largest in the state. The cathedral boasts a 3-manual, 48-rank Reuterpipe organ inaugurated in 2004.

See also
List of Catholic cathedrals in the United States
List of cathedrals in the United States

References

External links
Official Cathedral Site
Roman Catholic Diocese of Alexandria Official Site
Diocesan website for St. Francis Xavier Cathedral

19th-century Roman Catholic church buildings in the United States
Beaux-Arts architecture in Louisiana
Buildings and structures in Alexandria, Louisiana
Churches in Rapides Parish, Louisiana
Gothic Revival church buildings in Louisiana
Churches on the National Register of Historic Places in Louisiana
Religious organizations established in 1834
Francis Xavier Alexandria
Roman Catholic churches completed in 1899
Roman Catholic churches in Louisiana
Roman Catholic Diocese of Alexandria in Louisiana
Tourist attractions in Alexandria, Louisiana
National Register of Historic Places in Rapides Parish, Louisiana
1834 establishments in Louisiana